Webbooks (a portmanteau of web and notebook computer) are a class of laptop computers such as the litl, Elonex and Coxion webbook computers.

The word may also refer to books that are available in HTML on the web. and the NIST Chemistry WebBook, a scientific database of chemical properties maintained by the National Institute of Standards and Technology.

The word may also refer to The WebBook Company of Birmingham, Michigan, which planned to deliver a Net computer based on the PSC1000 RISC processor (then and now also known as the ShBoom) designed by Charles H. Moore.

Legal issues
 was filed by Robert & Colleen Kell of Austin, Texas on 18 November 2008. The application was deemed abandoned on Aug. 23, 2009.

See also
 Netbook
 Tablet computer

References

Mobile computers
Electronic publishing